Daria-Ioana Vişănescu (born 3 August 1996) is a Romanian chess player who holds the title of Woman FIDE Master (WFM) (2006).

Biography
Daria-Ioana Vişănescu learned to play chess at the age of five. At the age of nine, she won for the first time at the Romanian Girl's Chess Championship. In 2006, she won the European Youth Chess Championship for girls in the U10 age group and became a Women FIDE Master (WFM). In the following years she won the Romanian Youth Chess, Fast Chess and Blitz Championships in different girls age groups. In 2012, in Prague Daria-Ioana Vişănescu won a silver medal at the European Youth Chess Championships for girls in the U16 age group (tournament won Marja Tantsiura). 

Daria-Ioana Vişănescu two times participated in the European Girls' U18 Team Chess Championships (2011, 2014), where she won silver (2014) medal in team scoring, as well as silver (2011) medal in individual scoring.

References

External links

Daria-Ioana Vişănescu chess games at 365Chess.com

1996 births
Living people
Romanian female chess players
Chess Woman FIDE Masters